Events during the year 1991 in Northern Ireland.

Incumbents
 Secretary of State - Peter Brooke

Events
3 June - The British Special Air Service kills three Provisional Irish Republican Army (IRA) members in the Coagh ambush.
2 November - An IRA bomb explodes in Musgrave Park Hospital, Belfast, killing two British Army soldiers and injuring 11 other people.
Roscoff Restaurant in Belfast becomes the first in Northern Ireland to be awarded a Michelin star.

Arts and literature
Brian Keenan publishes An Evil Cradling, an autobiographical account of more than four years as a hostage in Beirut.
Michael Longley's collection Gorse Fires is published; it will win the Whitbread Poetry Award.

Sport

Football
Irish League
Winners: Portadown

Irish Cup
Winners: Portadown 2 - 1 Glenavon

Motorcycling
Robert Dunlop wins the 125cc race at the Cookstown 100, and the 125cc and Junior TT races at the Isle of Man TT.

Births

Deaths
17 October - J. G. Devlin, actor (born 1907).
13 November - Francis Blackwood, 10th Baron Dufferin and Claneboye (born 1916).
 November - George Otto Simms, Archbishop of Armagh.

Full date unknown
Professor John Dundee, leading anaesthetist (born 1921).

See also
1991 in England
1991 in Scotland
1991 in Wales

References

 
Northern Ireland